Moses Cordovero was a physician who lived at Leghorn (Livorno), Tuscany in the seventeenth century. David Conforte praises him as a good physician, and also on account of his scholarship and philanthropy. He was always eager to secure the release of prisoners through his personal influence as well as by ransom. Cordovero died at an advanced age.

References 

Jewish philanthropists
17th-century Italian physicians
17th-century Jewish physicians
Livornese Jews
Year of death unknown
Year of birth unknown